Latvia competed at the 1928 Summer Olympics in Amsterdam, Netherlands. 17 competitors, 15 men and 2 women, took part in 14 events in 6 sports.

Athletics

Men
Track & road events

Field events

Women
Track & road events

Field events

Cycling

Five cyclists, all men, represented Latvia in 1928.

Track cycling
Ranks given are within the heat.

Sailing

Weightlifting

Wrestling

Greco–Roman wrestling
 Men's

Art competitions

Latvia had two competitors in the Art competitions, Friedrich Baur, (mixed paintings, drawings and water colours), and Konstantīns Visotskis (mixed paintings, paintings).

References

External links
Official Olympic Reports

Nations at the 1928 Summer Olympics
1928
1928 in Latvian sport